Christianto Wibisono (10 April 1945 – 22 July 2021), also known as Oey Kian Kok was a prominent Chinese Indonesian business analyst in Indonesia. His father was Oey Koan Gwee (Huang Guan-guo) and his mother was Lo Tjoan Nio (Luo Zhuan-niang).

Early life
Wibisono was born in Jakarta, Java, Indonesia, and grew up in Semarang. He moved to Jakarta to pursue his degree in law and social sciences (Fakultas Hukum dan Ilmu Pengetahuan Kemasyarakatan) from the University of Indonesia in 1964. On campus, he was active as an editor and writer of numerous publications from 1966 to 1970. In 1971, he was the co-founder of Tempo weekly magazine but quit the new magazine in 1973. He continued his study in social sciences (FISIP) at the University of Indonesia in 1974 and got his degree in 1978. As an activist in 1978, he strongly opposed the government ban on press freedoms.

Career
Wibisono's critical analyses of geopolitics and macroeconomics have continuously played an effective role in ensuring national interest representation through policies enforced by Indonesian decision-makers. A natural-born author, Christianto co-founded TEMPO, a magazine considered the equivalent of "Time" in 1970, immediately following his graduation from the Graduate School of Political Science at the University of Indonesia.

From 1978 to 1983 he was appointed the Special Aide to the former Vice President of Indonesia, Adam Malik. In 1980 he established the Indonesian Business Data Center, a leading business consultant and data mining firm, while consistently presenting sharp political and economic insights and analysis through his columns on many of Indonesia's most reputable media such as Kompas and Suara Pembaruan among others. Christian to is also the author of some of Indonesia's most controversial books, namely "The Imaginary Interview with Bung Karno" which unveiled the scenes of Indonesia's political regime in power throughout the nation's first and second presidential transition.

In 1998, Christianto and his family relocated to Washington, D.C., U.S.A, where he continuously monitored the development of Indonesia and regional South East Asia, and bridged the gap between the regions and Capitol Hill. During his stay in the US, he managed to gain an offer by former Indonesian president Abdurrahman Wahid; for a top cabinet position of Coordinating Minister of Economic Affairs in June 2001, which he then declined.

Today, the wealth of his expertise and globalized perspective is accumulated in the establishment of Global Nexus Institute, a national think tank dedicated to materializing the goal of positioning Indonesia as the world's potential leading economy in the present global shift of power from the West to the East.

Death
Wibisono died in Jakarta on 22 July 2021, due to COVID-19 during the COVID-19 pandemic in Indonesia.

Notes

External links
 Christianto Wibisono profile at Gramedia.com
 Christianto Wibisono profile at Business Week

Bibliography

1945 births
2021 deaths
Indonesian people of Chinese descent
Indonesian expatriates in the United States
Indonesian writers
Indonesian activists
People from Semarang
Deaths from the COVID-19 pandemic in Indonesia